Rotterdam is a city in the Netherlands.

Rotterdam may also refer to:

Geography
Rotterdam (town), New York, a town in New York state
Rotterdam (CDP), New York, a hamlet in New York state
Port of Rotterdam
Nomuka, an island in Tonga previously named Rotterdam

Ships
SS Rotterdam (1872)
Two ships built for the Holland America Line:
 SS Rotterdam, an ocean liner built in 1959, now a hotel and museum in Rotterdam
 MS Rotterdam, a cruise ship built in 1997
 HNLMS Rotterdam, two ships of the Dutch navy

Other
Rotterdam (play), 2015 play by Jon Brittain
"Rotterdam (Or Anywhere)", a 1996 hit single by The Beautiful South
"Rotterdam", single by Chuck Ragan 2009

See also
Rotherham, a town in Yorkshire, England